Patrick Silvester Hilliman (born 17 April 1982) is a Dutch retired basketball player. In his career, Hilliman played for Dutch Basketball League (DBL) clubs Rotterdam Challengers and ZZ Leiden. From 2007 till 2011, Hilliman played 30 games for the Dutch national basketball team.

Career
From 2005 till 2009 Patrick played in Spain for several teams in the lower divisions of the country.

In 2009 Hilliman left Spain for Holland to go play for the Rotterdam Challengers. Hilliman had an impressive debut season in the DBL, as he averaged 13.6 points and a league-leading 10.2 rebounds per game. Midway through the 2010–11 season Hilliman made a transfer to Zorg en Zekerheid Leiden, after also Groningen and Den Bosch were looking to acquire him.

During his stand with Leiden Hilliman won two DBL's, a NBB Cup and two Supercups. He was also named a DBL All-Star again in 2011–12.

For the 2013–14 season Hilliman took his talents to Belgium, where he would start playing for Sint-Jan Basket in the Belgian Second Division. Eurobasket.com named him the Defensive Player of the Year and got him a place in the All-Tweede Nationale Team.

For the 2014–15 season Hilliman returned to Holland, when he signed with Port of Den Helder Kings. In December 2014, Den Helder Kings was declared bankrupt and was dissolved.

Hilliman played three more years at amateur level in Belgium with Basics Melsese.

Honours

Club
 Zorg en Zekerheid Leiden
Dutch Basketball League (2): 2010–11, 2012–13
NBB Cup (1): 2011–12
Dutch Supercup (2): 2011, 2012

Individual
 Rotterdam Challengers
DBL rebounding leader (1): 2009–10
DBL All-Star (1): 2010
 Zorg en Zekerheid Leiden
DBL All-Star (1): 2012

References

External links
 eurobasket.com profile

1982 births
Living people
B.S. Leiden players
CB Clavijo players
Centers (basketball)
Den Helder Kings players
Dutch expatriate basketball people in Spain
Dutch expatriate basketball people in the United States
Dutch Basketball League players
Dutch men's basketball players
Dutch people of Sint Eustatius descent
High Point Panthers men's basketball players
Junior college men's basketball players in the United States
Livingstone College alumni
Power forwards (basketball)
Feyenoord Basketball players
Sint Maarten sportspeople